Murray Heimberg is an American medical scientist currently Distinguished Professor Emeritus at University of Tennessee Health Science Center.

References

Year of birth missing (living people)
Living people
University of Tennessee faculty
American pharmacologists
Place of birth missing (living people)